Rai Gulp is an Italian free-to-air television channel owned and operated by state-owned public broadcaster RAI – Radiotelevisione italiana. It is the company's television channel for early teenagers, and is known for its programming for children between the ages of eight and fourteen.

History
Rai Gulp began broadcasting on 1 June 2007 as a replacement of Rai Doc and Rai Futura, the latter two were closed shortly before its launch.

Since 2009, when RaiSat Smash Girls end broadcasting in 2009, some programs that were broadcast on that channel have been present in the schedule of the channel

From 27 April 2010, the programming of the channel has been coordinated by the Rai Ragazzi structure.

From autumn 2010 the channel slightly changes aspect (for example in promos and bumpers) and changes the target audience into the range from 8 to 14 years. New cartoons, children's fiction, and other products are added.

From 1 January 2011, the official speaker of Rai Gulp is the voice actor Emanuele Ruzza.

Since 13 December 2016, the channel has been broadcasting the oldest cartoons with 4:3 format in the 16:9 pillar-box panoramic format, as well as Rai Yoyo, as well as all the other Rai digital terrestrial channels.

From 4 January 2017, the channel is visible in high definition on Tivùsat.

On 10 April 2017, the channel renews its logo and graphics at the same time as the other Rai channels.

On April 14, 2017, Luca Milano replaces Massimo Liofredi as head of Rai Gulp and Rai Yoyo.

From July 2020 onward, Rai Gulp no longer has its own website but is visible in streaming on RaiPlay.

From December 2021, the SD version closed on Tivùsat, so the HD version is now FTA

Programming

Current programming

 101 Dalmatian Street
 Acquanauti
 Aria
 Arthur e i Minimei
 Artù e gli amici della Tavola Rotonda
 Atchoo!
 Atomic Betty
 Avatar - La leggenda di Aang
 Avengers Assemble
 Baby Boss: Di nuovo in affari
 Bat Pat
 Battle Spirits - Sword Eyes
 Belle e Sebastien
 Berry Bees
 Bu-Bum! La strada verso casa
 Capeta
 Code Lyoko (st. 2-4)
 Cosmic Cowboys
 Deltora Quest
 Dennis and Gnasher scatenati
 Di-Gata Defenders
 Digimon Fusion Battles
 DuckTales
 Elena of Avalor
 Extreme Football
 Flatmania
 Geronimo Stilton
 Gormiti
 H2O - Avventure da sirene
 Heidi
 Hilda
 I grandi classici di Gino il pollo
 I pirati della porta accanto
 Il destino delle Tartarughe Ninja
 Inazuma Eleven GO
 Inazuma Eleven GO Chrono Stones
 Inazuma Eleven GO: Galaxy
 Inazuma Eleven: Ares
 Indomite
 International Super Spy: The Series
 Iron Man: Armored Adventures
 Jumanji
 Kid Lucky
 Kung-Foot: la squadra delle meraviglie
 Kung Fu Panda - Le zampe del destino
 L'isola del tesoro
 La leggenda di Enyo
 La leggenda di Korra
 Leo da Vinci
 Le avventure di Tom Sawyer
 Le avventure di Uniqua e Pablo
 Le epiche avventure di Capitan Mutanda
 Le nuove avventure di Nanoboy
 Le nuove avventure di Peter Pan
 Linkers
 Lost in Oz
 Lupo
 Marblegen
 Marco e Star contro le forze del male
 Max & Maestro
 Mia and Me (st. 2-3)
 Mini Ninjas 
 Mermaid Melody Pichi Pichi Pitch 
 Monster Buster Club
 OPS - Orrendi per sempre
 Paf il cane
 Peanuts
 Pitt & Kantrop
 Pumpkin Reports
 Rapunzel - La serie
 Regal Academy
 Robin Hood - Alla conquista di Sherwood
 Pop Secret 
 Principesse sirene - Mermaid Melody
 Sailor Moon Crystal
 Rat-Man
 Red Caps
 Rock Your Style: Avventure Missionarie
 Ruby Gloom
 Scream Street
 Spider-Man
 Spike Team (st. 2)
 
 Star Wars Rebels
 Il libro della giungla (serie animata 2010)
 Thunderbirds Are Go
 Tutti pazzi per Moose
 Winx Club (st. 6-7)
 Wolverine e gli X-Men
 World of Winx
 Zorro - La leggenda

Anime programming 
 Lilpri
 Ojamajo Doremi
 Pretty Cure
 Jewelpet: Magical Change
 Sailor Moon

Former programming 

 11-11: En mi cuadra nada cuadra
 A casa di Raven
 Alex & Co
 Amika
 Anubis (st. 3)
 Appuntamento al tubo
 Austin & Ally
 Backstage
 Bia
 Big Time Rush
 Binny e il fantasma
 Buck
 Cercami a Parigi
 Club 57
 Code Lyoko - Evolution
 Coop & Cami: A voi la scelta
 Dance Academy (st. 3)
 Diggers
 Dinosapien
 Double Trouble
 El refugio
 Galis Summer Camp
 
 Ginevra Jones
 Grachi
 Grand Star
 Grani di pepe
 Hank Zipzer - Fuori dalle righe
 Heidi Bienvenida
 Hotel 13
 I Dream
 I fantasmi di casa Hathaway
 Il mistero di Campus 12
 Jamie Johnson
 
 Le avventure di Sarah Jane
 Le isole dei pirati
 Le sorelle fantasma
 Life with Boys
 Lola & Virginia
 Lucas Etc
 Loulou de Montmartre
 Maggie & Bianca Fashion Friends
 Maghi contro alieni
 Malhação
 Marta & Eva
 Naturalmente Sadie!
 Patatine fritte
 Penny on M.A.R.S.
 POV - I primi anni
 Que Talento!
 Rebelde Way
 Sara e Marti
 School Hacks
 Seven and Me
 So Random!
 Somos tú y yo
 Somos tú y yo, un nuevo día
 Soy Luna
 Split
 Spooksville
 Sueña conmigo
 Talent High School - Il sogno di Sofia
 The Athena
 
 The Italian Diary
 Violetta
 Wolfblood - Sangue di lupo

Programmi 

 #Explorers
 Amazing World
 Ciak Gulp
 Edugame
 Festival della canzone europea dei bambini
 Green Meteo
 Gulp Cinema
 Gulp Forward
 Gulp Girl
 Gulp Magic
 Gulp Mistery
 Gulp Music
 Gulp Odeon
 Happy Dance
 Il campo avventura di Bindi
 Il diario di Bindi
 Junior Eurovision Song Contest
 La Banda dei FuoriClasse
 La TV Ribelle
 LOL :-)
 Mega Gulp
 Missione Spazio
 Missione Spazio Reloaded
 Music Gate
 Music Planet
 Next Tv
 Non è magia
 Parole di Pace, Parole di Guerra
 Pausa Posta
 Radio Teen
 Ricette a colori
 Rob-O-Cod
 School Rocks
 Snap
 Space to Ground - Guida per viaggiatori galattici
 Sport Stories
 Stelle domani
 Teen Voyager
 Tiggì Gulp
 Too Gulp
 Top Music
 Versus - Generazione di campioni

Logos

References

External links
Official website 

Children's television networks
Free-to-air
Gulp
Television channels and stations established in 2007
Italian-language television stations